Statistics of American Soccer League in season 1923–24.

League standings

Goals leaders

External links
The Year in American Soccer - 1924

American Soccer League (1921–1933) seasons
American Soccer League, 1923-24